Lamothe-en-Blaisy is a former commune in the Haute-Marne department in north-eastern France. On 1 January 2017, it was merged into the commune Colombey-les-Deux-Églises. Its population was 55 in 2019.

Geography
The Blaise river flows through the commune.

See also
Communes of the Haute-Marne department

References

Lamotheenblaisy